The 2013–14 Rubin season was the 10th successive season that the club played in the Russian Premier League, the highest tier of association football in Russia. Kazan played in the Russian Cup, reaching the Fifth Round, the Europa League, reaching the Round of 32 and the Russian Premier League.

In December 2013, manager Kurban Berdyev was fired after 13 years with the club, being replaced by Vladimir Maminov the following month.

Squad

Out on loan

Reserves

Transfers

Summer

In:

Out:

Winter

In:

Out:

Competitions

Russian Premier League

Results by round

League table

Matches

Russian Cup

UEFA Europa League

Qualifying stages

Group stage

Knockout stages

Squad statistics

Appearances

|-
|colspan="14"|Players away from Rubin on loan:

|-
|colspan="14"|Players who appeared for Rubin no longer at the club:

|}

Goal Scorers

Disciplinary record

Notes
Notes

References

FC Rubin Kazan seasons
Rubin Kazan
Rubin Kazan